North Korean Guys, also released as Lost in the South Mission: Going Home, is a 2003 South Korean comedy film directed by Ahn Jin-woo. The film depicts a pair of North Korean sailors who find themselves in South Korea and their subsequent attempts to return home.

Plot synopsis
Hard-nosed North Korean Navy officer Baek-doo Choi (Jung Joon-ho) and his light-hearted sergeant Dong-hae Lim (Gong Hyung-jin), go on a fishing trip in the Sea of Japan. The pair fall asleep in their boat and are violently awoken by a squall. Clinging to their tiny craft, they struggle to survive the storm. By the time the storm passes, they have been washed deep into South Korean borders. Realizing their plight, they conceal their boat and explore their surroundings.

They are continually shocked by the culture of South Korea, but eventually recover their bearings and befriend a girl, Han Nara (Ryu Hyun-kyung). Unfortunately for the sailors trapped in enemy territory, Nara is a runaway and her father is a police chief, which only makes it more difficult for them to blend in. After their repeated attempts to escape fail, they enter a talent contest in order to win the first place prize: a trip to Kumgang Mountain, North Korea.

See also 
 The Russians Are Coming, the Russians Are Coming

External links 
 
 

2003 films
2003 comedy films
South Korean comedy films
Films set in North Korea
Films set in Gangwon Province, South Korea
2000s Korean-language films
Films about North Korea–South Korea relations
2000s South Korean films